The 146th Air Support Operations Squadron is an air support operations (air-ground liaison) squadron of the United States Air Force. The official title of the 146th ASOS is "Plains Warriors."

Overview
The 2005 Base Realignment and Closure Commission (BRAC) recommendations began the process to redistribute the 137th Airlift Wing's eight C-130H aircraft from Will Rogers Air National Guard Base and implemented the process to stand up an Air Support Operations Squadron (ASOS); to be aligned with and provide close air support (CAS) to the 45th Infantry Brigade Combat Team of the Oklahoma Army National Guard.  In September 2007 the last of the C-130's departed Will Rogers.  As 2007 was the centennial year of the statehood of Oklahoma and one which marked the end of one era in its military history the squadron number was deemed to be a 100-series designation.  As Oklahoma was the 46th state admitted to the Union, the soon-to-be established ASOS was officially given its designation of "146".  One year later the squadron was officially activated in a ceremony presided over by the Adjutant General of Oklahoma MG Harry M. Wyatt III.  Designated as the first commander of the 146th was Lt. Col. Bruce P. "Ham Fist" Hamilton; who served from 2008 to 2013.  He was succeeded by Lt. Col. James B. Waltermire.  

Air support operations squadrons of the United States Air Force
Military units and formations established in 2008